Kingston and the Islands is a federal electoral district in Ontario, Canada, that has been represented in the House of Commons of Canada since 1968.

It covers part of the city of Kingston, Ontario and the sparsely populated Frontenac Islands in the St. Lawrence River.

It has been represented since the 2015 federal election by Liberal Mark Gerretsen.

Demographics
 Average family income: $68,494 (2001)
 Median household income: $46,310
 Unemployment:    8.1%
 Language, Mother Tongue: English  84%, French 3%, Other 13%
 Religion: No Religious Affiliation 30%, Catholic 28%, Protestant 27%, Orthodox Christian 1%, Other Christian 10%, Muslim 2%, Jewish 1%, Other 1%
 Visible Minority: Total visible minority population 9.85% (11,595), Chinese 2.1% (2,495), South Asian 2% (2,395), Black 1.5% (1,775), Arab 0.8% (1,010), Filipino 0.65 (770), Other 2.8%

History

The riding was created in 1966 from Kingston and parts of Hastings—Frontenac—Lennox and Addington and Prince Edward—Lennox.

In 1966, it was defined to consist of the City of Kingston, the Townships of Howe Island, Kingston and Wolfe Island, and the southwest part of the Township of Pittsburg, in the County of Frontenac; and the Township of Amherst Island in the County of Lennox and Addington.

In 1996, the Township of Pittsburgh portion of the riding was redefined to consist of the part of the township lying to the south of Highway 401.

In 2003, it was redefined to consist of the Township of Frontenac Islands and the City of Kingston in the County of Frontenac.

In 2013, the riding's borders were adjusted to remove the area north of Highway 401 from the riding, which became part of a new district, Lanark—Frontenac—Kingston. These new borders came into effect for the 2015 federal election.

Members of Parliament

This riding has elected the following Members of Parliament:

Election results

See also
 List of Canadian federal electoral districts
 Past Canadian electoral districts

References

Federal riding history from the Library of Parliament
2011 Results from Elections Canada
 Campaign expense data from Elections Canada

Notes

Kingston, Ontario
Ontario federal electoral districts